David Hilliard (born 1964 in Lowell, Massachusetts) is an American photographer. A fine arts photographer who works mainly with panoramic photographs, he draws inspiration from his personal life and those around him for his subject matter. Many of the scenes are staged, evoking a performative quality, a middle ground between fact and fiction.

He received his MFA from Yale University in 1994. He lives in Boston, Massachusetts, and Maine.

Education 
1994 MFA, Yale University School of Art, New Haven, Connecticut
1992 BFA, Massachusetts College of Art, Boston, Massachusetts

Exhibitions 
Recent Solo Exhibitions
 2017 David Hilliard - Provincetown Art Association and Museum, Provincetown, Massachusetts 
 2016 “Our Nature”, Mattatuck Museum, Waterbury, Connecticut 
 2015 “Our Nature”, Elizabeth Leach Gallery, Portland, Oregon 
 2014 “Tall Tales & Short Stories”, Florida Museum of Photographic Arts, Tampa, Florida 
 2013 “The Tale is True”, La Galerie Particuliere, Paris, France 
 2013 "The Tale is True," Yancey Richardson Gallery, New York, New York
 2012 Art Museum at the University of Kentucky, Lexington, Kentucky
 2012 Watkins College of Art, Design & Film, Nashville, Tennessee
 2011 "The Lives of David Hilliard," La Galerie Particuliere, Paris, France 
 2011 "Great Expectations: David Hilliard & David Rathman," Mark Moore Gallery, Culver City, California
 2011 "Masculinity and Rites of Passage: Photography by David Hilliard," The Groton School, Groton, Massachusetts
 2010 “Tending to Doubt,” Jackson Fine Art, Atlanta, Georgia
 2010 “Highway of Thought,” Dartmouth College, Hanover, New Hampshire
 2009 “Highway of Thought,” University of Maine Museum of Art, Bangor, Maine
 2009 “Being Like,” Mark Moore Gallery, Santa Monica, California
 2009 “Being Like,” Carroll and Sons, Boston, Massachusetts
 2008 “Being Like,” Yancey Richardson Gallery, New York, New York

Recent group exhibitions
 2014 “Through the Lens: Portraiture & Self Portraiture”, Elizabeth Leach Gallery, Portland, Oregon
 2014 “Breaking Ground”, the College of William & Mary, Williamsburg, Virginia
 2014 “Glimpse,” Gallery at Cassilhaus Chapel Hill, North Carolina
 2014 “In Residence: Contemporary Artists at Dartmouth”, Hood Museum of Art, Hanover, New Hampshire
 2013 “The Kids Are All Right”, Addison Museum of American Art, Andover, Massachusetts
 2013 “Transgressive Photography from the Hood Museum of Art”, Hanover, Massachusetts
 2013 “Woods, Lovely, Dark and Deep”, DC Moore Gallery, New York, New York
 2013 A selection of images from “The Tale is True”, Schoolhouse Gallery, Provincetown, Massachusetts
 2013 “Stocked: Contemporary Art from the Grocery Aisles”, Ulrich Museum of Art, Wichita, Kansas
 2012 “The Kids Are All Right”, Kohler Arts Center, Sheboygan, Wisconsin
 2012 “Shared Vision: The Sondra Gilman and Celso Gonzalez-Falla Collection of Photography,” Aperture Foundation, New York, New York
 2012 “Do or Die. The Human Condition in Painting and Photography,” Stiftung Deutsches Hygiene Museum, Dresden, Germany
 2011 “Beautiful Vagabonds, Birds in Contemporary Photography, Video and Sound,” Yancey Richardson Gallery, New York, New York
 2011 “Hero Worship”, Mindy Sololmon Gallery, St. Petersburg, Florida
 2011 “Conversations: Photography from the Bank of America Collection”, Museum of Fine Arts Boston, Boston, Massachusetts
 2011 “Becoming Muses” The Center for Photography at Woodstock, Woodstock, New York
 2011 “Masculinity and Rites of Passage: Photography by David Hilliard”, The Groton School, Groton, Massachusetts
 2011 “People Power Places: Reframing the American Landscape”, Davidson College, Davidson, North Carolina
 2011 “Remember Then: An Exhibition on the Photography of Memory”, Concourse Gallery - Center for Government and International Studies, Harvard University, Cambridge, Massachusetts
 2011 “Open: A 25th Anniversary Show”, Mark Moore Gallery, Culver City, California
 2010 “Incognito, The Hidden Self-Portrait”, Yancey Richardson Gallery, New York, New York
 2010 “Do or Die. The Human Condition in Painting and Photography,” The Wallraf-Richartz, Museum & Foundation Corboud, Cologne, Germany
 2009 “Out of the Box: Photography Portfolios from the Permanent Collection,” DeCordova Museum, Lincoln, Massachusetts
 2009 “Athens of America,” St. Botolph Club, Boston, Massachusetts
 2009 “Glitz and Grime,” Yancey Richardson Gallery, New York, New York
 2008 “The Gaze,” Singer Editions, Boston, Massachusetts
 2008 “The Good Life,” Yancey Richardson Gallery, New York, New York
 2008 “For Artʼs Sake,” Open House Gallery, New York, New York,
 2008 “Presumed Innocence: Photographs of Children,” DeCordova Museum and Sculpture Park, Lincoln, Massachusetts

Complete exhibitions list available here: David Hilliard's CV

Selected collections
 Art Museum at the University of Kentucky, Lexington, Kentucky
 Addison Gallery of American Art, Andover, Massachusetts
 Art Institute of Chicago Art Museum, Chicago, Illinois
 Columbia Museum of Art, Columbia, South Carolina
 Fidelity Investments, Boston, Massachusetts
 Fogg Museum, Harvard University, Cambridge, Massachusetts
 George Eastman House, Rochester, New York
 Harvard Art Museum, Cambridge, Massachusetts
 LaSalle Bank Photography Collection, Chicago, Illinois
 List Visual Art Center, Massachusetts Institute of Technology, Cambridge, Massachusetts
 Miami Art Museum, Miami, Florida
 Microsoft Art Collection, Redmond, Washington
 Museum of Contemporary Art, Los Angeles, California
 Museum of Contemporary Art, Jacksonville, Florida
 Museum of Fine Arts, Boston, Massachusetts
 Neuberger and Berman, New York, New York
 New Britain Museum of American Art, New Britain, Connecticut
 New Mexico Museum of Art, Santa Fe, New Mexico
 Philadelphia Museum of Art, Philadelphia, Pennsylvania
 Portland Museum of Art, Portland, Oregon
 Sir Elton John, Atlanta, Georgia - London, England
 The Boston Public Library, Boston, Massachusetts
 The Cleveland Clinic, Lyndurst, Ohio
 The Columbia Museum of Art, South Carolina
 The Community of Madrid, Madrid, Spain
 The DeCordova Museum, Lincoln, Massachusetts
 The Los Angeles County Museum, Los Angeles, California
 The University of Maine, Bangor, Maine
 The University of Salamanca, Salamanca, Spain
 Whitney Museum of American Art, New York, New York
 Yale University Art Gallery, New Haven, Connecticut

Grants and awards 
2015 Artist residency, Twenty Summers, Provincetown, Massachusetts
2015 Bok Center Award for excellence in teaching, Harvard University, Cambridge, Massachusetts
2012 Bok Center Award for excellence in teaching, Harvard University, Cambridge, Massachusetts
2010 Artist in residence, Dartmouth College, Hanover, New Hampshire
2008 Massachusetts College of Art and Design Alumni Association Achievement Award, Boston, Massachusetts
2002 Peter S. Reed Foundation Grant, New York, New York
2001 John Simon Guggenheim Foundation Fellowship, New York, New York
2000 Certificate of Distinction in Teaching, Harvard University, Cambridge, Massachusetts
1999 Artist grant, Massachusetts Cultural Council, Boston, Massachusetts
1995 Fulbright Grant, exchange between U.S. and Spain (Barcelona)
1994 Alice Kimball English Travel Fellowship, Yale University, New Haven, Connecticut

References 

David Hilliard's website
Carroll and Sons Gallery
Yancey Richardson Gallery
Jackson Fine Art Gallery
La Galerie Particuliere
Schoolhouse Gallery

Living people
1964 births
Yale School of Art alumni
American photographers
Massachusetts College of Art and Design alumni
People from Lowell, Massachusetts